Víctor Manuel Mejía Múnera (July 11, 1959 – April 29, 2008), aka "El Mellizo (the twin)" or "Pablo Arauca", was a Colombian drug lord and former paramilitary leader along twin brother Miguel Ángel of the United Self-Defense Forces of Colombia (AUC) commanding the Bloque Vencedores de Arauca which demobilized in 2006.

Mejia-Munera along with twin brother Miguel Ángel were wanted by the United States and Colombian governments on charges related to the Illegal drug trade in Colombia and forming illegal paramilitary groups for terrorist purposes.

On December 5, 2007 an operation led by Colombian National Police DIJIN police intelligence captured members of his personal army of hitmen known as "Los Nevados", mostly former members of the paramilitary groups.

Death
Victor Manuel was killed in a Colombian National Police operation conducted by an elite unit on April 29, 2008. The operation took place between the municipalities of Tarazá and Caucasia, Department of Antioquia near the border with the Department of Córdoba where Mejía Múnera had sought refuge. He was escorted by six or eight people, two of whom were his personal bodyguards and were killed in the operation, only three of these survived. The Colombian National Police localized Mejia Munera after an informant tipped off the authorities. Initially the police said they killed Victor Manuel's brother. The confusion arose, because Victor Manuel was carrying his brothers papers. His brother Miguel Ángel was captured less than 72 hours after Víctor Manuel's death.

On May 2, 2008 Caracol Radio announced that the body of Victor Mejía had been claimed by the daughter several days later.

Colombian minister of Defense Juan Manuel Santos informed that Mejia-Munera had five arrest warrants and one extradition petition by the United States. Colombian authorities also related the Cocaleros protest of the weeks before his death in the municipality of Tarazá to Mejía-Múnera as a strategy to distract authorities and escape.

References

External links
DEA: Víctor Manuel Mejía Múnera
 El Tiempo: Víctor Manuel Mejía Múnera
 Primerapagina.com Victor Manuel Mejia Munera

1959 births
2008 deaths
Colombian drug traffickers
Colombian twins
Fugitives
Members of the United Self-Defense Forces of Colombia
People shot dead by law enforcement officers in Colombia